Patrick Flynn (1867 – February 1948) was an Irish hurler who played as a right corner-forward for the Limerick senior team.

Born in Kilfinane, County Limerick, Condon first played competitive hurling in his youth. He was a regular for the Limerick senior hurling team during a successful period at the end of the 19th century. During his inter-county career he won one All-Ireland medal and one Munster medal.

At club level Flynn was a two-time championship medallist with Kilfinane.

Honours

Player

Limerick
All-Ireland Senior Hurling Championship (1): 1897
Munster Senior Hurling Championship (1): 1897

References

1867 births
1948 deaths
Kilfinane hurlers
Limerick inter-county hurlers
All-Ireland Senior Hurling Championship winners